The following ships of the Indian Navy have been named Rana:

 was a R-class destroyer acquired in 1949 from the Royal Navy, where it served in World War II as 

Indian Navy ship names